Hubert Hammerer (10 September 1925 – 24 March 2017) was an Austrian sports shooter. He competed at the 1960 and 1964 Olympics in five rifle events and won a gold medal in 300 m 3 positions in 1960. He was the Olympic flag bearer for Austria at the 1964 Games.

References

1925 births
2017 deaths
Austrian male sport shooters
Shooters at the 1960 Summer Olympics
Shooters at the 1964 Summer Olympics
Olympic shooters of Austria
Olympic gold medalists for Austria
Olympic medalists in shooting
Medalists at the 1960 Summer Olympics